The  is an archaeological site in the Kashiwai neighborhood of the city of Ichikawa, Chiba Prefecture, in the Kantō region of Japan containing a middle to late Jōmon period  shell midden. The midden was designated a National Historic Site of Japan in 1967.

Overview
During the early to middle Jōmon period (approximately 4000 to 2500 BC), sea levels were five to six meters higher than at present, and the ambient temperature was also 2 deg C higher. During this period, the Kantō region was inhabited by the Jōmon people, many of whom lived in coastal settlements. The middens associated with such settlements contain bone, botanical material, mollusc shells, sherds, lithics, and other artifacts and ecofacts associated with the now-vanished inhabitants, and these features, provide a useful source into the diets and habits of Jōmon society. Most of these middens are found along the Pacific coast of Japan.

The Ubayama site is located on the left bank of the Ohashiwa River, which flows into Tokyo Bay, on a plateau with an elevation of about 24 meters above the present sea level.  The midden is horseshoe-shaped, measuring approximately 130 meters from east-to-west and 120 meters from north-to-south, forming an incomplete shell ring. The presence of a shell mound in this location was known at a relatively early time, and a preliminary survey was first made in 1893. It was first excavated in 1926 by Tokyo Imperial University, at which time a group of 20 pit dwellings indicating the existence of a settlement were discovered. Five sets of human bones (two adult males, two adult females, and one child) were excavated from one of pit dwelling sites, believed to be members of the same family group. This was the first excavation of a Jōmon period settlement associated with a shell midden. Further excavations found a total of 39 pit dwellings and 143 sets of human remains, along with large quantities of Jōmon pottery. The midden contained shells from more than 30 species of clams, and was used about 5000 years to 3000 years ago. The bones of fugu puffer fish have also been found in the midden, indicating that this fish was part of the Japanese diet since the Jōmon period, although there is no evidence that the family group found in the 1926 excavation died of tetrodotoxin poisoning. The excavated items from this site are stored at the University of Tokyo, Nanzan University, Meiji University, and other locations, and are also exhibited at the Ichikawa Archeology Museum, which was built adjacent to the Horinouchi Shell Mound, also in the city of Ichikawa. 

See also

List of Historic Sites of Japan (Chiba)
List of shell ring sites

References

External links
Ichikawa City home page 
Chiba Prefecture home page 

Archaeological sites in Japan
Jōmon period
Ichikawa, Chiba
Shell middens in Japan
History of Chiba Prefecture
Historic Sites of Japan